"Anyone Can Play Guitar" is a song by the English rock band Radiohead, released as the second single from their debut album, Pablo Honey (1993). It reached number 32 in the UK and number 97 in Australia.

Track listing

UK CD
"Anyone Can Play Guitar" (single edit) – 3:21
"Faithless the Wonder Boy" – 4:14
"Coke Babies" – 2:58

Netherlands CD
"Anyone Can Play Guitar" (single edit) – 3:21
"Faithless the Wonder Boy" – 4:14

Australia CD
"Anyone Can Play Guitar" – 3:24
"Creep" – 3:57
"Pop Is Dead" – 2:12
"Thinking About You (EP Version)" – 2:17
"Killer Cars (Acoustic)" – 2:15

 Note: Track 5 recorded live at The Cabaret Metro for JBTV in Chicago on June 30, 1993.

12" promo
"Anyone Can Play Guitar" – 3:25
"Faithless the Wonder Boy" – 4:14
"Coke Babies" – 2:58

Personnel
Radiohead
Thom Yorke – lead vocals, rhythm guitar, tape loops
Colin Greenwood – bass guitar
Jonny Greenwood – lead guitar
Ed O'Brien – rhythm guitar, backing vocals
Philip Selway – drums

Charts

References

External links
 "Anyone Can Play Guitar" video at YouTube

Radiohead songs
Parlophone singles
1993 singles
Songs written by Thom Yorke
Songs written by Colin Greenwood
Songs written by Jonny Greenwood
Songs written by Philip Selway
Songs written by Ed O'Brien
1992 songs